William Hathorne (–1681) was a widely influential man in early New England. He arrived on the ship Arbella.

Hathorne is also the first American ancestor of the distinguished author Nathaniel Hawthorne (who added the "w" to the spelling of his last name).

Early life
Hathorne was the son of yeoman William Hathorne, of Binfield, Berkshire, and his wife, Sara. The family lived in "substantial", "comfortable circumstances." The elder William, in his will proved in 1651, left all his "lands, buildings and tenements" in Berkshire not to the by then absent eldest son, William, but to a younger son Robert, on condition that Robert give William one hundred pounds. The younger William Hathorne had gone to America in 1630, and rose to prominence there through his own talent and efforts.

Life in Massachusetts
He was a prosperous merchant in Salem, Massachusetts, was admitted as a freeman in 1634, served as a deputy representing Salem for many terms and when the House of Deputies elected a speaker for the first time, he was the one chosen. He served in that capacity for several years thereafter and was Salem's commanding character of the time period.

Hathorne was a zealous advocate of the personal rights of freemen against royal emissaries and agents.

Hathorne served as a magistrate on the highest court, and received a grant of 640 acres for service to the state. He was elected assistant to the governor in 1662 and served until 1679.  He was appointed as captain of the Salem military company on May 1, 1646, and led troops to victory in King Philip's War.  He was commissioned as a major in 1656.

Personal life
Later, Hathorne married a certain Anne Smith and had at least two children, one of whom, Elizabeth (b. 22 July 1649), married Israel Porter (1643-1706) and was the grandmother of Israel Putnam.

Influence on Nathaniel Hawthorne

William Hathorne was a reflection of the Puritan society in which he lived.  Puritans came to Massachusetts to obtain religious freedom for themselves, but had no particular interest in becoming a haven for other faiths.  The laws were harsh, with punishments that included fines, deprivation of property, banishment or imprisonment.  For example, Hathorne had Quakers whipped in the streets of Salem.

Hathorne's son, Judge John Hathorne, is also a symbol of this period. People believed that witches were real.  There was no scientific explanation for individuals' bizarre behavior, so witchcraft appeared to be the logical explanation for people's fits (which experts now suspect may have been the result of ergotism). Nothing caused more fear in the Puritan community than people who appeared to be possessed by the devil.  Witchcraft was a major felony. Judge Hathorne is the best known of the witch trial judges, and he became known as the "Hanging Judge" for sentencing witches to death.

Author Nathaniel Hawthorne, who descended from these men, used his ancestors as inspiration for some of his most famous works.  He was much interested in colonial history, good vs. evil, and the psychology of Puritan society.  His classic novels The Scarlet Letter and The House of the Seven Gables, and the short story "Young Goodman Brown" reflect his studies.

References

External links
 Salem, MA Web site

Year of birth uncertain
1681 deaths
People from Salem, Massachusetts
1606 births